Highway 908 is a provincial highway in the north-west region of the Canadian province of Saskatchewan. It runs from Highway 155 to Île-à-la-Crosse on Lac Île-à-la-Crosse. Highway 908 is about 21 km (13 mi) long.

See also 
Roads in Saskatchewan
Transportation in Saskatchewan

References 

908